Ian Bruce (born 25 January 1935) is an Australian former long jumper who competed in the 1956 Summer Olympics.

References

External links
 

1935 births
Living people
Australian male long jumpers
Olympic athletes of Australia
Athletes (track and field) at the 1956 Summer Olympics
20th-century Australian people